Cambridge (Māori: Kemureti) is a town in the Waipa District of the Waikato region of the North Island of New Zealand.

Cambridge was a finalist in the 2017 and 2019 New Zealand's Most Beautiful Large Town awards, run by Keep New Zealand Beautiful. It was awarded the title New Zealand's Most Beautiful Large Town in October 2019.

History
Prior to the arrival of Europeans there were a number of Maori pā in the vicinity of what would become Cambridge. In the 1850s missionaries and farmers from Britain settled in the area and introduced modern farming practices to local Maori, helping them set up two flour mills and importing grinding wheels from England and France. During the 1850s, wheat was a profitable crop but when merchants in Auckland began purchasing cheaper grain from Australia the market went into decline.

The European town of Cambridge was established when the 3rd Regiment of the Waikato Militia were settled there in 1864 following the Invasion of the Waikato. The town was named after Prince George, Duke of Cambridge, the Commander-in-Chief of the British Army at the time.

Electric street lights were first switched on in 1922.

Demographics

Cambridge had a population of 18,654 at the 2018 New Zealand census, an increase of 2,553 people (15.9%) since the 2013 census, and an increase of 4,755 people (34.2%) since the 2006 census. There were 7,080 households, comprising 8,925 males and 9,726 females, giving a sex ratio of 0.92 males per female, with 3,690 people (19.8%) aged under 15 years, 3,147 (16.9%) aged 15 to 29, 7,908 (42.4%) aged 30 to 64, and 3,918 (21.0%) aged 65 or older.

Ethnicities were 90.1% European/Pākehā, 10.5% Māori, 1.5% Pacific peoples, 5.3% Asian, and 1.8% other ethnicities. People may identify with more than one ethnicity.

The percentage of people born overseas was 24.1, compared with 27.1% nationally.

Although some people chose not to answer the census's question about religious affiliation, 50.4% had no religion, 38.7% were Christian, 0.5% had Māori religious beliefs, 0.7% were Hindu, 0.2% were Muslim, 0.5% were Buddhist and 2.0% had other religions.

Of those at least 15 years old, 3,279 (21.9%) people had a bachelor's or higher degree, and 2,682 (17.9%) people had no formal qualifications. 3,045 people (20.3%) earned over $70,000 compared to 17.2% nationally. The employment status of those at least 15 was that 7,413 (49.5%) people were employed full-time, 2,133 (14.3%) were part-time, and 408 (2.7%) were unemployed.

Governance 

Cambridge is administered by the Waipa District Council. It is the largest town in the District, but not the seat of the council, which is at Te Awamutu.

Nationally, Cambridge is part of the  general electorate and the  Māori electorate.

Economy
Cambridge's main sources of employment and income come from dairy farming, tourism, the equine industry and sport. Dairy farming provides more than one in 10 jobs in the Waipa District. The tourism industry supports 12.7% of jobs in Waipa District. The equine industry provides more than 600 jobs in the Waikato, with many based in and around Cambridge. It is estimated that one in five Cambridge residents work in nearby Hamilton.

Transport 
Cambridge lies adjacent to State Highway 1, which connects the town with Hamilton in the northwest and Tauranga, Rotorua and Taupo in the southeast. Access to Cambridge from the north is via the Cambridge Road and Victoria Road interchanges, and from the south is via the Tirau Road interchange. Prior to the Waikato Expressway extension opening in December 2015, SH 1 ran through the centre of Cambridge.

State Highway 1B leaves SH 1 at the Victoria Road interchange and provides a route north to SH 1 at Taupiri, providing a route north towards Auckland while bypassing Hamilton to the east.

Hamilton Airport, 18 minutes drive from Cambridge, is the nearest airport and provides daily flights to all New Zealand's main centres.

A public bus service connects Cambridge with central Hamilton via Tamahere and Waikato University several times daily.

Cambridge was formerly the terminus of the Cambridge Branch railway, but this closed beyond Hautapu in 1999.

Until the railway was built the Waikato River was the main form of transport, Cambridge being the limit of navigation. Steamers continued to serve Cambridge until the 1930s. The wharf was near the Karapiro Stream, where the river was wide enough for steamers to turn.

Rural districts 
There are a number of nearby rural districts which identify socially and economically with Cambridge. These districts would typically have a few hundred residents, a primary school and a community hall for local social events. In the early 20th century, many of these districts also had their own small milk processing factories. These districts are Bruntwood, French Pass, Goodwood/Fencourt, Hautapu, Hora Hora, Karapiro, Kaipaki, Maungatautari, Te Miro, and Whitehall

Sport

National sports headquarters
Cambridge and nearby Lake Karapiro have become the homes for national sports organisations such as cycling (track, road, mountain biking and BMX), rowing, triathlon and as high performance centres for kayaking and canoeing.

Cycling
A purpose built velodrome facility, the Grassroots Trust Velodrome, was opened by William and Catherine, the Duke and Duchess of Cambridge, in Cambridge on 12 April 2014. In December 2015, Cambridge hosted the 2015–16 UCI Track Cycling World Cup. There are also many cycle and walking tracks that have been purpose built around Cambridge. The  Te Awa River Ride, from Ngāruawāhia to Karapiro, is planned to be fully open by the end of 2021. It currently has two paths open which are for cyclists and walkers. The purpose built track runs from the center of Cambridge out to the velodrome and follows the Waikato river. There is also a wide cycleway running from Leamington to Lake Karapiro Domain. Cambridge will host the New Zealand National Road Race Championships and the accompanying time trial between the years of 2020 and 2022 with an option for a fourth year, the event will take place in mid February.

Thoroughbred horse studs
The town is now well known for its Thoroughbred studs and stables, which have produced many champion horses in the sports of racing and show jumping. Cambridge is popularly known as the 'equine capital' of New Zealand. Internationally known thoroughbred studs in the area include:
 Cambridge Stud
 Chequers Stud
 Blue Gum Lodge
 Trelawney Stud
 Windsor Park Stud

Rowing
Lake Karapiro, recognised as one of the premium rowing lakes in the world, is close by, producing several world rowing champions, notably Rob Waddell, Robbie Manson, the Evers-Swindell twins, Georgina and Caroline, Mahé Drysdale and James Dallinger. The 2010 World Rowing Championships were held at Lake Karapiro.

Rugby Union
Cambridge is home to two clubs, Hautapu Sports Club, founded in 1903, and Leamington Rugby Sports Club, founded in 1897.

Football
Cambridge is home to Cambridge FC who were the 2017 and 2015 Waikato Bay of Plenty Premiership champions, and Waipa Sports Club of the Year in 2014 and 2015.

Events 
Cambridge and the surrounding district is host to many sporting, cultural and trade events. More than 120,000 visitors attend the National Agricultural Fieldays every year at the Mystery Creek Events Centre between Cambridge and Hamilton.

Every summer, Lake Karapiro hosts the Waka Ama Sprint National Championships and the hydroplane racing as part of the New Zealand Grand Prix Circuit. In February, the Keyte Watson Polo Tournament takes place at Leamington, Cambridge. Every March, Cambridge holds its four-day Autumn Festival and in December, a Christmas Festival (including a town parade) takes place.

Cambridge's local annual event is the Battle of the Bridges, a rugby and netball competition between the two sports clubs in Cambridge, Leamington and Hautapu, however the trophy is awarded to the winning team in the rugby match. The event takes place in August each year. The first ever match between
the two sides, in 2013, ended in a 0–0 draw.

Media 
Switch FM is a local radio station.

Cambridge also has two local newspapers, the Cambridge News and the Cambridge Edition.

There is also a lively Facebook page that is used to share and request information and resources.

Education 

Cambridge also has two non-state schools with similar names.

Notable residents
Past or present residents include:
Kylie Bax, Model and actress
Hamish Bond, MNZM, Rower, Olympic gold medallist
Kenny Cresswell, member of 1982 All Whites (football)
 Members of The Datsuns Rock Band
Mahé Drysdale, MNZM, Rower, Olympic gold medallist
Katie Duncan, international footballer and Olympian
Matthew Dunham, World Champion silver medallist in rowing
Allyson Gofton, cooking writer and television presenter
Juliette Haigh, World Champion gold medallist in rowing
Nikki Hamblin, Middle distance runner and winner of Fair Play Award at 2016 Summer Olympics
Ricki Herbert, CNZM, former coach of New Zealand All Whites and international footballer.
 Sir Patrick Hogan KNZM, CBE, Horse breeder 
Nikita Howarth, Paralympic swimmer and gold medallist
Luke Jacobson, Professional Rugby Union player and All Black 
Mitch Jacobson, Professional Rugby Union player
Billy T. James, MBE, Entertainer and comedian
Spencer Jones, Professional Rugby Union player
 Sir Vaughan Jones, Fields Medal winner
Joelle King, Squash player
Regan King, Rugby Union player
Dick Myers, All Black (played for Leamington RFC)
Eric Murray, MNZM, rower, Olympic gold medallist
Ritchie Pickett, country music singer/songwriter
Ken Rutherford, MNZM, International cricketer and horse racing club manager
Wayne Smith, CNZM, All Black and assistant coach of World Cup winning All Blacks in 2011 and 2015
Joel Tobeck, Actor
Sarah Walker, Olympic silver medallist in BMX
 Sir Mark Todd, equestrian double Olympic gold medallist
Sarah Ulmer, World Champion and Olympic gold medallist cyclist 
Rob Waddell, Olympic gold medallist in rowing
Chris Wood, international footballer and All Whites captain

Cambridge was also the birthplace of All Black Sir Colin Meads KNZM MBE; George Albert Tuck (1884–1981), a notable New Zealand builder, soldier and diarist;  artist Frances Irwin Hunt 1890–1981) and educationalist Blanche Eleanor Carnachan, MBE, (1871–1954).

Notes

References

External links

 Cambridge i-Site Information Centre
 Cambridge Museum
1902 photo of water tower

 
Populated places in Waikato
Waipa District
Populated places on the Waikato River